Charley Hearn (born 11 November 1983) is a footballer, who plays play for Southern Counties East Football League club Erith & Belvedere.

Career
Hearn started his career at Millwall as a trainee, making 28 League appearances.

He then moved to Northampton Town on loan for a month, in December 2004, the loan was later extended until the end of the season. At the end of the 2004–05 season, Hearn was released from Millwall, the midfielder joined Fisher Athletic.

At the end of the 2006–07 season, new Fisher Athletic manager Wayne Burnett released the entire squad, including Hearn. Charley was soon signed by his former Fisher manager, Justin Edinburgh for Grays Athletic.

On 1 February 2008, Hearn was sent on a month's loan to Conference South outfit Lewes. He was then sent out on loan again on 13 March 2008 to Ebbsfleet United until the end of the 2007–08 season.

He was released from Grays Athletic at the end of the season along with Nicky Eyre, Danny Knowles, Cameron Mawer and Santos Gaia.

Hearn then moved to Southern Counties East Football League club Beckenham Town in 2008.

References

External links

1983 births
Living people
People from Ashford, Kent
English footballers
Association football midfielders
Millwall F.C. players
Northampton Town F.C. players
Hendon F.C. players
Fisher Athletic F.C. players
Grays Athletic F.C. players
Lewes F.C. players
Ebbsfleet United F.C. players
Beckenham Town F.C. players
Erith & Belvedere F.C. players
English Football League players
National League (English football) players